Cove Creek High School, also known as the Cove Creek Elementary School, is a historic high school building located at Sugar Grove, Watauga County, North Carolina.  It was built by the Works Progress Administration in 1940–1941, and is a two-story, Collegiate Gothic style stone building.  It is seven bays wide and features slightly projecting square stair towers and a crenellated roof parapet.  It was designed by Clarence R. Coffey, an apprentice of Frank Lloyd Wright, and constructed by local artisans and laborers using local stone and wood sources.

It was listed on the National Register of Historic Places in 1998.

References

High schools in North Carolina
Works Progress Administration in North Carolina
School buildings on the National Register of Historic Places in North Carolina
School buildings completed in 1941
Buildings and structures in Watauga County, North Carolina
National Register of Historic Places in Watauga County, North Carolina